2Y or 2-Y may refer to:
2Y, IATA code for Air Andaman
2Y, one of several models of Toyota Y engine

See also
Y2 (disambiguation)